John Cort may refer to:
 John Cyrus Cort (1913–2006), a Christian socialist writer and activist
 John E. Cort (born 1953), a professor of Religion and Indologist
 John Cort (impresario), an early 20th-century American financier of concerts, plays, or operas